Vima Takto or Vima Taktu (Greco-Bactrian: Οοημο Τακτοο, Oēmo Taktoo; Kharosthi: 𐨬𐨅𐨨 𐨟𐨑𐨆) was a Kushan emperor who reigned c. 80–90 CE.

Rule
Vima Takto was long known as "The nameless King", since his coins only showed the legend "The King of Kings, Great Saviour", until the discovery of the Rabatak inscription helped connect his name with the title on the coins.

Vima Takto's empire covered northwestern India and Bactria towards China, where Kushan presence has been asserted in the Tarim Basin. During his reign, Kushan embassies were also sent to the Eastern Han imperial court.

Genealogy
He is mentioned in the Chinese historical chronicle Book of the Later Han, in relation to his father Kujula Kadphises:

"Qiujiuque (Ch: 丘就卻) [Kujula Kadphises] was more than eighty years old when he died. His son, Yangaozhen (Ch:閻高珍) [probably Vema Tahk(tu) or, possibly, his brother Sadaṣkaṇa], became king in his place. He defeated Tianzhu [North-western India] and installed Generals to supervise and lead it. The Yuezhi then became extremely rich. All the kingdoms call [their king] the Guishuang [Kushan] king, but the Han call them by their original name, Da Yuezhi."

The connection of Vima Takto with other Kushan rulers is described in the Rabatak inscription, which was written by Kanishka. Kanishka makes the list of the kings who ruled up to his time: Kujula Kadphises as his great-grandfather, Vima Takto as his grandfather, Vima Kadphises as his father, and himself Kanishka:

"... for King Kujula Kadphises (his) great grandfather, and for King Vima Taktu (his) grandfather, and for King Vima Kadphises (his) father, and *also for himself, King Kanishka" (Cribb and Sims-Williams 1995/6: 80)

A later inscription found at Vima's sanctuary at Mat, also records that he was the grandfather of Huvishka.

Footnotes

References
Falk, Harry (2009). The name of Vema Takhtu. W. Sundermann, A. Hintze & F. de Blois (eds.), Exegisti monumenta - Festschrift in Honour of Nicholas Sims-Williams (Iranica, 17). Wiesbaden : Harrassowitz, pp. 105–116.
Hill, John E. (2009) Through the Jade Gate to Rome: A Study of the Silk Routes during the Later Han Dynasty, 1st to 2nd Centuries CE. BookSurge, Charleston, South Carolina. .
Shrava, Satya (1985) The Kushana Numismatics, p 94.

External links 
 Coins of Vima Takto
 Hill, John E. 2004. The Western Regions according to the Hou Hanshu. Draft annotated English translation.

Kushan emperors
1st-century monarchs in Asia